Sakuraga-ike is an earthfill dam located in Toyama prefecture in Japan. The dam is used for irrigation. The catchment area of the dam is 10.9 km2. The dam impounds about 17  ha of land when full and can store 1452 thousand cubic meters of water. The construction of the dam was completed in 1954.

References

Dams in Toyama Prefecture
1954 establishments in Japan